Choristoneura palladinoi is a species of moth of the family Tortricidae. It is found in Ethiopia.

The wingspan is about 15 mm. The ground colour of the forewings is pale ferruginous with dark rust-brown markings. The hindwings are brownish.

Etymology
The species is named for Mr. Alenuccio Palladino who collected the species.

References

Moths described in 2010
Choristoneura